The 1972 United States presidential election in Oregon took place on November 7, 1972. All fifty states and the District of Columbia were part of the 1972 United States presidential election. Voters chose six electors to the Electoral College, who voted for president and vice president.

Oregon was won by the Republican nominees, incumbent President Richard Nixon of California and his running mate Vice President Spiro Agnew of Maryland. Nixon and Agnew defeated the Democratic nominees, Senator George McGovern of South Dakota and his running mate U.S. Ambassador Sargent Shriver of Maryland.

Nixon carried Oregon with 52.45% of the vote to McGovern's 42.33%, a victory margin of 10.12%, which made Oregon 13% more Democratic than the nation-at-large. 

Independent candidate John G. Schmitz would carry 4.98% of the popular vote in Oregon, which would make the state his fourth strongest after Idaho, Alaska and Utah.

Results

Results by county

See also
 United States presidential elections in Oregon

References

Oregon
1972
1972 Oregon elections